Toolbelt Diva was a do-it-yourself television program on Discovery Home in the U.S. from 2004–2008. Hosted by Norma Vally, this half-hour show encouraged and empowered women to take on home improvement projects themselves.

References

External links
 Toolbelt Diva official site
 Chix Can Fix - Norma Vally's official site
 Screaming Flea productions page
 

Discovery Home (American network) original programming
2000s American reality television series
2004 American television series debuts
2008 American television series endings